Lanthus is a genus of club-tailed dragonflies found in North America, commonly called pygmy clubtails. They are found in Japan and North America. The species are clear winged with black bodies and yellow markings.

This genus includes the following species:
Lanthus fujiacus 
Lanthus parvulus  – northern pygmy clubtail
Lanthus vernalis  – southern pygmy clubtail

References

External links

Lanthus, BugGuide

Gomphidae
Anisoptera genera
Taxa named by James George Needham